The Piano Concerto No. 18 in B major, KV. 456 is a piano concerto by Wolfgang Amadeus Mozart. In Mozart's own catalogue of his works, this concerto is dated 30 September 1784.

The work is orchestrated for solo piano, flute, two oboes, two bassoons, two horns, and strings.

History 
For years, historical speculation was that Mozart had written this concerto for Maria Theresa von Paradis, based on a letter written around that time by Leopold Mozart to his daughter Nannerl. However, Hermann Ullrich has discounted this theory, based on the date of entry in Mozart's catalogue and the fact that von Paradis had left Paris at the start of October 1784, which indicated that there was not sufficient time to send von Paradis the concerto for performance. Richard Maunder has countered with the idea that Mozart could still have sent the concerto to Paris and that it would have been forwarded to von Paradis in London, where it was possible that she performed the work in March 1785.

Music 
The concerto is in three movements:

The slow movement is a theme and variations. Martha Kingdon Ward has commented that the slow movement of this concerto contains one of the "most tranquil" of Mozart's flute solos, specifically in the G-major variation.

This changing of tempo in rondo finales was contrary to common practice at the time. Joel Galand has performed a Schenkerian analysis of the rondo finale and noted features such as its novel use of II as a remote key. In practical terms, this means that the last movement leaves the home key of B-flat major for an episode in the apparently-unrelated key of B minor, a highly unusual procedure in the musical language of the time.

Mozart wrote out two cadenzas for the first movement. Joseph Swain has performed a Schenkerian analysis of each first-movement cadenza.

References

External links 

18
Compositions in B-flat major
1784 compositions